The 2015 AFC Champions League was the 34th edition of Asia's premier club football tournament organized by the Asian Football Confederation (AFC), and the 13th under the current AFC Champions League title.

Guangzhou Evergrande won the tournament after defeating Al-Ahli in the final. Guangzhou also qualified for the 2015 FIFA Club World Cup.

Western Sydney Wanderers were the defending champions, but they were eliminated in the group stage.

Association team allocation
The AFC Competitions Committee proposed a revamp of the AFC club competitions on 25 January 2014, which was ratified by the AFC Executive Committee on 16 April 2014. The member associations are ranked based on their national team's and clubs' performance over the last four years in AFC competitions, with the allocation of slots for the 2015 and 2016 editions of the AFC club competitions determined by the 2014 rankings:
The top 24 member associations (MAs) as per the AFC rankings are eligible to receive direct slots in the AFC Champions League, as long as they fulfill the AFC Champions League criteria.
In both the East and West zones, there are a total of 12 direct slots in the group stage, with the 4 remaining slots filled through play-offs.
The top six MAs in both the East and West zones get direct slots in the group stage, while the remaining MAs get play-off slots:
The first- and second-ranked MAs each get three direct slots and one play-off slot.
The third- and fourth-ranked MAs each get two direct slots and two play-off slots.
The fifth-ranked MAs each get one direct slot and two play-off slots.
The sixth-ranked MAs each get one direct slot and one play-off slot.
The seventh- to twelfth-ranked MAs each get one play-off slot.
The maximum number of slots for each MA is one-third of the total number of clubs in the top division (e.g., Australia can only get a maximum of three total slots as there are only nine Australia-based clubs in the A-League).

The AFC Competitions Committee finalised the slot allocation for the 2015 and 2016 editions of the AFC Champions League based on the criteria, including AFC's MA rankings and the implementation of club licensing regulations, on 28 November 2014.

Notes

Teams
The following 49 teams from 21 associations entered the competition.

In the following table, the number of appearances and last appearance count only those since the 2002–03 season (including qualifying rounds), when the competition was rebranded as the AFC Champions League. TH means title holders.

Notes

Schedule
The schedule of the competition was as follows (all draws were held in Kuala Lumpur, Malaysia).

Qualifying play-off

The bracket for the qualifying play-off, which consisted of three rounds (preliminary round 1, preliminary round 2, and play-off round), was determined by the AFC based on the association ranking of each team. Each tie was played as a single match, with the team from the higher-ranked association hosting the match. Extra time and penalty shoot-out were used to decide the winner if necessary. The winners of each tie in the play-off round advanced to the group stage to join the 24 automatic qualifiers. All losers in each round which were from associations with only play-off slots entered the 2015 AFC Cup group stage.

Preliminary round 1

Preliminary round 2

Play-off round

Group stage

The draw for the group stage was held on 11 December 2014. The 32 teams were drawn into eight groups of four. Teams from the same association could not be drawn into the same group. Each group was played on a home-and-away round-robin basis. The winners and runners-up of each group advanced to the round of 16.

Tiebreakers
The teams are ranked according to points (3 points for a win, 1 point for a draw, 0 points for a loss). If tied on points, tiebreakers are applied in the following order:
Greater number of points obtained in the group matches between the teams concerned;
Goal difference resulting from the group matches between the teams concerned;
Greater number of goals scored in the group matches between the teams concerned;
Greater number of away goals scored in the group matches between the teams concerned;
If, after applying criteria 1 to 4, teams still have an equal ranking, criteria 1 to 4 are reapplied exclusively to the matches between the teams in question to determine their final rankings. If this procedure does not lead to a decision, criteria 6 to 10 apply;
Goal difference in all the group matches;
Greater number of goals scored in all the group matches;
Penalty shoot-out if only two teams are involved and they are both on the field of play;
Fewer score calculated according to the number of yellow and red cards received in the group matches (1 point for a single yellow card, 3 points for a red card as a consequence of two yellow cards, 3 points for a direct red card, 4 points for a yellow card followed by a direct red card);
Team who belongs to the member association with the higher AFC ranking.

Group A

Group B

Group C

Group D

Group E

Group F

Group G

Group H

Knockout stage

In the knockout stage, the 16 teams played a single-elimination tournament, with the teams split between the two zones until the final. Each tie was played on a home-and-away two-legged basis. The away goals rule, extra time (away goals do not apply in extra time) and penalty shoot-out were used to decide the winner if necessary.

Bracket

Round of 16
In the round of 16, the winners of one group played the runners-up of another group in the same zone, with the group winners hosting the second leg.

Quarter-finals
The draw for the quarter-finals was held on 18 June 2015. Teams from different zones could not be drawn into the same tie, and there was no seeding or country protection, so teams from the same association could be drawn into the same tie.

Semi-finals
In the semi-finals, the matchups were determined by the quarter-final draw.

Final

In the final, the finalist from the West Zone hosted the first leg, while the finalist from the East Zone hosted the second leg (no draw was held to determine the order of legs, as it was reversed from the previous season's final).

Awards

Dream team
The AFC selected the following 11 players as 2015 AFC Champions League dream team.

Top scorers

See also
2015 AFC Cup
2015 FIFA Club World Cup

References

External links
AFC Champions League, the-AFC.com

 
1
2015